This article concerns the period 839 BC – 830 BC.

Events and trends
 836 BC—Shalmaneser III of Assyria leads an expedition against the Tabareni.
 836 BC—Civil war breaks out in Egypt.

Significant people
 Adad-nirari III, king of Assyria, is born (approximate date).
 Shoshenq IV, pharaoh of Egypt is born (approximate date).

References 

 

kk:Б. з. д. 832 жыл